Hayward High School is a public high school in Hayward, California, United States, serving students living in northern Hayward and portions of Castro Valley, Cherryland and Fairview. It is one of four high schools in the city and is one of the oldest high schools in Northern California. The school's official mascot is the "Farmer", which dates back to Hayward's period as an agricultural center. Its emblem features a farmer with a plow, a reference to the city's agricultural past.

History 
Founded in 1892, Hayward High is one of the oldest high schools in the San Francisco Bay Area. The first true high school that opened in 1893 was called Union High School #3. It served students from Hayward, Castro Valley, San Lorenzo, Redwood, Palomares, and Stonybrook. Initially, it was a one-story building with a basement. 

As late as the 1960s, students still rode their horses to school and tied them to hitching posts. The architecture for the new buildings included ionic columns, low-pitched roofs, and friezes of goods. This building, built in 1911, lasted until Hayward High moved to its current campus in 1962, to make way for the City Center Building. 

Frederic Johnson was principal of the school from the 1911 opening to 1935. The school gymnasium became the now demolished Centennial Convention Center.

Demographics 
Hayward High had an enrollment of 1,665 students in the 2014 school year.

Notable alumni 

 Mahershala Ali, Academy Award winning actor (transferred to Mt. Eden High School)
 Chauncey Bailey, journalist, editor-in-chief of The Oakland Post
 Jeff Barnes, National Football League linebacker, Los Angeles and Oakland Raiders from 1977 to 1987
Davion Berry (born 1991), basketball player in the Israeli Basketball Premier League
 C. J. Brown, soccer player, Major League Soccer, Chicago Fire
 D. J. Carrasco, MLB baseball player, Kansas City Royals
 Frank Cope, National Football League offensive tackle, New York Giants from 1938 to 1947
 Jack Del Rio, former NFL head coach, Oakland Raiders
 Chris Eckert, actor and member of The Groundlings
 Tom Eplin, actor
 Ed Galigher, National Football League defensive lineman, New York Jets and San Francisco 49ers from 1972 to 1978
 Samora Goodson, wide receiver including for the San Jose SaberCats in 2008 and 2011–2013
 Eddie House, point guard, Miami Heat and 2008 NBA champion Boston Celtics
 Prerna Lal, writer and attorney
 Laura Lam, speculative fiction author
 Eric Lane, National Football League running back, Seattle Seahawks from 1981 to 1987
 Jon Miller, Major League Baseball announcer
 Landon Curt Noll (1979), astronomer, cryptographer and mathematician
 Diamon Simpson (born 1987), basketball player in the Israel Basketball Premier League
 Don Wakamatsu, Manager of the Seattle Mariners; first Asian-American Major League Baseball manager; bench coach Oakland A's, Texas Rangers
 Bill Walsh, Pro Football Hall of Fame head coach San Francisco 49ers and Stanford University football head coach
 Adrian Ward, cornerback, UTEP, Minnesota Vikings
 Andre Ward, Olympic gold medalist, 2004 Olympics boxing champion
 Michael Darren Young, outfielder and designated hitter, Major League Baseball

References

External links 
 
 

High schools in Alameda County, California
Hayward Unified School District
Educational institutions established in 1892
Public high schools in California
1892 establishments in California
Buildings and structures in Hayward, California